Tal Chhapar Sanctuary is a sanctuary located in the Churu district of Northwestern Rajasthan, in the Shekhawati region of India. It is known for blackbucks and is also home to a variety of birds. The sanctuary is 210 km from Jaipur on the fringe of the Great Indian Desert and situated on road from Ratangarh to Sujangarh. The Tal Chhapar sanctuary lies in the Sujangarh Tehsil of Churu District. It lies on the Nokha-Sujangarh state highway and is situated at a distance of 85 km from Churu and about 132 km from Bikaner. The nearest railway station is Chappar which lies on Degana-Churu-Rewari line of North Western Railways. The nearest airport is Jaipur which is 215 km from Chappar.

Tal Chhapar is a refuge of the blackbuck.

Geography and geology
The sanctuary is named after Chhapar village which is located at 27°-50' North and 74°-25' East.  It is a flat saline depression locally known as a "tal" that has a unique ecosystem in the heart of the Thar Desert. Perched at a height of 302 meters (990 feet) above sea level. Tal Chhaper Sanctuary, with almost flat tract and interspersed shallow low-lying areas, has open grassland with scattered Acacia and Prosopis trees which give it an appearance of a typical savanna.  The word "tal" means pond or ‘talab’ in Hindi.  The rain water flows through shallow low-lying areas and collect in the small seasonal water ponds.

The geology of the zone is obscured by the wind blown over-burden.  Some small hillocks and exposed rocks of slate and quartzite are found in the western side of the sanctuary. The area between hillocks and the sanctuary constitutes the watershed area of the sanctuary.  The whole sanctuary used to be flooded by water during the heavy rains but with salt mining going on in the watershed, hardly any rain falling on the hillocks reaches the sanctuary. Near by villages are Jogalia, Jaitasar, Bidasar.

Flora and fauna

The forest of this region falls under major group "Tropical Forest"  as per classifications of Indian forests by Champion & Seth.  The forest of sanctuary area again falls under the group "Topical Thorn Forest" and sub group 6B/C "Desert Thorn Forests".

The sanctuary area is mostly covered by grasses with a very few trees.

It lies on the passageway of many migratory birds such as harriers. These birds pass through this area during September. Birds commonly seen in the sanctuary are harriers, eastern imperial eagle, tawny eagle, short-toed eagle, sparrow, and little green bee-eaters, black ibis and demoiselle cranes, which stay till March. Skylarks, crested larks, ring doves, and brown doves are seen throughout the year.
Desert fox and Wildcat can also be spotted along with typical avifauna such as partridge and sand grouse.

Tal Chappar Sanctuary comes alive with the chirping of various migratory birds including Montagu's harrier, marsh harrier, pale harrier, imperial eagle, tawny eagle, short toed eagle, sparrow hawk, skylark, crested lark, ring drove, brown dove, blue jay, southern grey shrike, Indian spotted creeper, green bee eaters, black ibis and demoiselle cranes.

In the Tal Chhapar Sanctuary, a special type of grass is found. This grass is called Mothiya locally. The word "Mothiya" comes from the word "Moti" or from the Hindi word for pearl. The shape of the seed of this grass is like very fine round shaped pearls. Mothiya has a very sweet taste. People enjoy eating it, but it is found in very small quantities. Production is only a few kilograms every season. Mothiya is also food for blackbucks and birds which dig it from the earth with their starks.

Climate
 
This region is characterized by a distinct winter (from October to February), summer (March to June) and monsoon (July to September). The zone has a dry climate with a large variation in temperature wind blows south – west during summer. The Tal Chhapar Zone comes under the principal arid zone of the country. Rainfall in this region is highly erratic. There is a large variation in mean annual rainfall in this region. The average rainfall in this region is about 300 mm.

Facilities

There is a rest house situated in the sanctuary area and being maintained by the forest department having six rooms accommodation, four of which are AC rooms.  It also has a basic dining facilty at a nominal charge. This rest house come under the control of Deputy Conservator of forest, Churu. Anyone can contact for accommodation to DCF, Churu. Chhapar – Sujangarh state highway divides the sanctuary area into two parts.  In the sanctuary there are Kacha tracks which are used for inspection, patrolling & viewing the fauna of the sanctuary.

News
In February 2006, Tal Chhaper was included in the itinerary of the "Heritage on Wheel" train. Now tourists have the opportunity to visit the sanctuary twice in a week by train.

In March 2006, Rs. 2 crore and 82 lacs budget announced by Hon'ble C.M. in her budget speech 2006-07 for the development of Tal Chhapar Sanctuary, for 2006-07 to 2010-11 (a five-year plan). The forest department has improved the grassland ecosystem of Tal Chhapar by undertaking several soil and water conservation works.

Tal Chhaper Sanctuary was included in the tourism map of Rajasthan tourism. Hon’ble CM has announced a project in the budget speech 2006-07 for the development of the sanctuary as an eco-tourism and wildlife tourism spot.  The project includes a five-year action plan amounting to Rs.2.82 crores for integrated development of the sanctuary. Budget provision for Rs.1.10 crores in the current financial year has been sanctioned. A high-level committee headed by Principal Secretary, Forest and comprising the famous architect Ms. Revathi Kamath, fashion designer international fame Ms. Bibi Russel, commissioner Tourism and Chief wildlife warden visited the sanctuary to make a comprehensive and integrated development action plan. Rajendra Dadhich president Rajasthan Vikas Parisad, Mumbai also visited.

The sanctuary has become an important destination for the birders, who visit in large numbers during winters.

See also
 Arid Forest Research Institute

References

External links
 Churu district
 Tal Chhapar on Rajasthan Tourism
 Tal Chapar Wildlife on Flickr

1966 establishments in Rajasthan
 Bird sanctuaries of Rajasthan
 Protected areas established in 1966
 Tourist attractions in Churu district
 Wildlife sanctuaries in Rajasthan